Dryburgh is a village in the Scottish Borders region of Scotland.

Dryburgh may also refer to:

Places 
 Dryburgh (Dundee district), Scotland
 Dryburgh Abbey, near Dryburgh on the River Tweed in the Scottish Borders
 Dryburgh Abbey Hotel, a baronial country house hotel, located on the banks of the River Tweed

People 
 Dryburgh (surname)
 Abbot of Dryburgh (later, Commendator of Dryburgh)
 Adam of Dryburgh (c. 1140–1212), Anglo-Scottish theologian, writer and Premonstratensian

Other 
 Dave Dryburgh Memorial Trophy, Canadian Football League